The All Saints' Flood of 1170 (Allerheiligenvloed) was a catastrophic flood in the Netherlands that took place in 1170. Large parts of the Northern Netherlands, and Holland territories were overflowed.

The flooding North Sea created the islands of Wieringen and Texel. Lake Flevo was once a fresh water lake, but . The Creiler Woods vanished under the waves. The sea area increased inside the Netherlands and large peat areas developed, which were easily washed away.

The flood rendered the settlement of Rotta (the predecessor of Rotterdam) uninhabitable, and marked the beginning of Amsterdam, where the area gained an open connection to the sea, and where a dam was built in the Amstel to protect the land from future floods.

See also
 Floods in the Netherlands

References

Rome's Greatest Defeat, A Review - All Saints' Flood of 1170. File retrieved March 11, 2007.
Buisman, Jan, Duizend jaar weer, wind en water in de Lage Landen (Deel 1: tot 1300), 

Floods in the Netherlands
12th-century floods
12th century in the Netherlands
Medieval weather events
Texel
Norderney